Teenage Mutant Ninja Turtles III is a 1993 American superhero film written and directed by Stuart Gillard. It is the sequel to Teenage Mutant Ninja Turtles II: The Secret of the Ooze (1991), and the final installment in the 1990–1993 Teenage Mutant Ninja Turtles series. It stars Elias Koteas, Paige Turco, Vivian Wu, Sab Shimono, and Stuart Wilson with the voices of Brian Tochi, Robbie Rist, Corey Feldman, and Tim Kelleher.

The creature effects were provided by the All Effects Company, rather than Jim Henson's Creature Shop, which acted as the provider for the previous films.

The film was released theatrically in the United States on March 19, 1993, by New Line Cinema. It received mostly negative reviews with a general consensus from the critics that the film did not feature any villains and stories from the original Mirage comics or the 1987 animated series. It received moderate box office success, grossing $54.4 million against a budget of $21 million, making it the lowest-rated entry in the series. An animated film TMNT was released in 2007 which makes reference to the prior live-action films. The film series was completely rebooted with 2014's Teenage Mutant Ninja Turtles, following the acquisition of the franchise by Viacom.

Plot

In 1603 feudal Japan, four samurai on horseback chase a young man into the woods. A mysterious woman hidden in the underbrush watches closely. The samurai capture the youth, who is revealed to be a prince named Kenshin.

In the present, it is two years after the previous film's events with the defeat of The Shredder and The Foot Clan. April O'Neil buys gifts for the Teenage Mutant Ninja Turtles while shopping at a flea market. At their underground lair, April gives Michelangelo an old lamp, Donatello an old radio, Leonardo a book on swords, and a fedora hat for Raphael. Splinter receives an ancient Japanese scepter.

Back in the past, Lord Norinaga, berates his son, Kenshin, for disgracing their family name. Kenshin argues that his father's desire for war is the true disgrace. When an English trader named Walker arrives to supply Norinaga with added manpower and firearms, Kenshin leaves to brood alone in a temple. There, he finds the scepter and reads the inscription: "Open Wide the Gates of Time".

In the present day, the scepter that April is holding lights up and blows wind. She is sent into the past as Kenshin takes her place; each is wearing what the other wore in their own time. Walker imprisons April after deducing she is not a witch and is powerless. Back in the present, Kenshin thinks the Turtles are "kappa". After Kenshin explains the time swap, the Turtles decide to rescue April. But according to Donatello's calculations, they only have 60 hours to rescue her before the scepter's power disappears due to the space time continuum being out of sync. Meanwhile, Casey Jones will watch over Kenshin and the lair. As the turtles warp through time, they are replaced by four of Norinaga's Honor Guards, who arrive confused.

The Turtles land in the past dressed as Honor Guards riding horses. Amid the confusion, Michelangelo rides into the forest and is ambushed by the mysterious woman. An unseen person takes the scepter from him. The other Turtles go to Norinaga's castle and rescue April and also free Whit, a prisoner resembling Casey. Their chaotic escape strands them in the wilderness. Back in the present, Casey introduces Kenshin and the Honor Guards to televised hockey, attempting to keep them calm.

In the woods, the Turtles, April, and Whit are attacked by villagers mistaking them for Norinaga's forces. Mitsu, the leader of the rebellion against Lord Norinaga, unmasks Raphael and sees that he looks like her prisoner. Realizing Michelangelo is her captive, the Turtles accompany Mitsu to her village. Upon arriving, Walker's men are burning the village. As the Turtles help the villagers save it, Michelangelo is freed and joins the fight. Walker is forced to retreat, but the fire has trapped a young boy named Yoshi inside a house. Michelangelo saves Yoshi, then Leonardo helps him recover by performing CPR; this earns the Turtles the villagers' gratitude and respect.

Walker bargains with Lord Norinaga over weapons for gold. Michelangelo consoles Mitsu about Kenshin, whom she loves. In the present, Casey tries to help the Honor Guards adjust to the 20th Century, while Kenshin and Splinter fear the Ninja Turtles will not return before the sixty hours are up.

In the past, Donatello has a replica scepter made, but Michelangelo and Raphael break it during an argument. Mitsu informs them that Lord Norinaga is buying Walker's guns and will attack the village the next morning. Raphael discovers that Yoshi has the original scepter. The Turtles are angry at Mitsu for hiding it and forcing them to fight her war. However, Mitsu's grandfather admits it was his idea for the Turtles to fight in her place.

Whit betrays everyone, captures Mitsu, and steals the scepter. The Turtles go to the palace to rescue Mitsu but are cornered by Norinaga and his soldiers. The Turtles free all prisoners, who join the battle. After lengthy fighting, Leonardo defeats Lord Norinaga in a sword duel. Walker escapes with the scepter, but is trapped at the boat dock. Walker throws the scepter into the air, but the Turtles catch it. Whit, who switched his alliance after Walker betrayed him, throws a fireball, knocking Walker off the dock to his death.

Michelangelo and Raphael want to stay in the past, feeling appreciated there. When Kenshin activates the scepter, their decision becomes urgent. Mitsu reminds Michelangelo of his promise to return Kenshin to his own time. Michelangelo reluctantly agrees, but he misses grabbing the scepter and is left behind. The Honor Guards switch back with the Turtles, except for Michelangelo. Fortunately, Benkei, the remaining Honor Guard, activates the scepter and swaps places with Michelangelo, just before the scepter burns out.

Norinaga surrenders to Mitsu, and Kenshin is given the scepter; the two lovers are reunited. Meanwhile, Michelangelo is depressed about growing up. Splinter cheers him up by performing an Elvis Presley impression, and the other Turtles join in with a final dance number.

Cast

Live action
 Paige Turco as April O'Neil
 Elias Koteas as Casey Jones / Whit
 Stuart Wilson as Walker
 John Aylward as Niles
 Sab Shimono as Lord Norinaga
 Vivian Wu as Mitsu
 Mak Takano as Benkei
 Henry Hayashi as Kenshin
 Travis A. Moon as Yoshi

Voice cast
 Brian Tochi as Leonardo
 Corey Feldman as Donatello
 Tim Kelleher as Raphael
 Robbie Rist as Michelangelo
 James Murray as Splinter

Rist and Tochi (who did the voices of Michelangelo and Leonardo, respectively) are the only 2 voice actors to voice the same character throughout all 3 live-action TMNT movies. Corey Feldman returned as the voice of Donatello, after being absent for the second movie.

Puppeteers
 Mark Caso as Leonardo (in-suit performer)
 Jim Martin as Leo (facial assistant)
 Larry Lam as Leonardo (in-suit martial arts stunt double)
 Jim Raposa as Donatello (in-suit performer)
 Rob Mills as Donatello (facial assistant)
 Steven Ho as Donatello (in-suit martial arts stunt double)
 Matt Hill as Raphael (in-suit performer)
 Noel MacNeal as Raphael (facial assistant)
 Hosung Pak as Raphael (in-suit martial arts stunt double)
 David Fraser as Michelangelo (in-suit performer)
 Gordon Robertson as Michelangelo (facial assistant)
 Allan Shishir Inocalla as Michelangelo (in-suit martial arts stunt double)
 James Murray as Splinter (puppeteer)
 Lisa Sturz as Splinter (assistant puppeteer)
 Tim Lawrence as Splinter (assistant puppeteer)

Music

Release

Home media
As with both of the previous films, the British PG version was censored due to usage of forbidden weapons (Michelangelo's nunchaku). For these scenes, alternate material was used. The cuts were waived for the DVD release.
The German theatrical and video version was based on the censored UK cut; the DVD is uncut.

The film was released to VHS and Laserdisc in 1993.

The film has been released on DVD, and also two Blu-ray box sets with both of its predecessors.

Reception

Box office
Teenage Mutant Ninja Turtles III debuted at number 1 at the U.S. box office with a gross of $12.4 million from 2,087 screens. The film grossed $42.2 million in the United States and Canada, and $12.2 internationally, giving a worldwide gross of $54.4 million.

Critical response
The film holds a 19% approval rating and has an average rating of 4.10/10 on Rotten Tomatoes based on 32 reviews, with the consensus: "It's a case of one sequel too many for the heroes in a half shell, with a tired time-travel plot gimmick failing to save the franchise from rapidly diminishing returns". On Metacritic it has a score of 40 out of 100 based on reviews from 12 critics, indicating "mixed or average reviews".

Michael Wilmington of Los Angeles Times noted that distributors deliberately kept the film away from critics. Despite mild praise for the look of the film, Wilmington called the first film a fluke hit and called this third film "sequel hell". James Berardinelli gave it one out of four stars, citing that "any adults accompanying their kids will have to invent new and interesting ways to stay awake. Not only is this movie aimed at young children, the script could have been written by them". TV Guide gave it two out of four stars and said in their review: "If the time-travel gimmick has to be employed twice in a row then it's probably best to banish these characters to a retirement sewer", when commenting about a possible future film invoking time travel.

While TMNT co-creator Peter Laird mentioned in the 2014's Turtle Power documentary that he disliked the film, Kevin Eastman noted the efforts taken to create it.

Future
There were early plans for a fourth installment. Playmates toy catalogues indicated a fourth film would be released in 1996 but it never materialized. A script entitled "TMNT IV: The Foot Walks Again" was written by Craig Shapiro and John Travis, while Peter Laird has released concept designs for a version which he says would have been titled "Teenage Mutant Ninja Turtles IV: The Next Mutation". Instead, the TV series Ninja Turtles: The Next Mutation was produced from 1997 to 1998, sharing little with the prior concept work besides the subtitle.

The next theatrical release was a 2007 CGI animated film titled simply TMNT which makes reference to the prior live-action films.

After Viacom bought the franchise in 2009, Paramount Pictures produced and released a reboot in 2014.

Notes

References

External links

 
 
 
 
 

1993 films
1993 independent films
1993 martial arts films
1990s English-language films
1993 action comedy films
1990s science fiction comedy films
1990s superhero films
1990s teen films
20th Century Fox films
American action comedy films
American independent films
American science fantasy films
American sequel films
Films about time travel
Films based on American comics
Films set in 1603
Films set in 1993
Films set in feudal Japan
Films set in New York City
Films shot in Astoria, Oregon
Films shot in Oregon
Films directed by Stuart Gillard
Films produced by Thomas K. Gray
Films produced by David Chan
Films produced by Kim Dawson
Films scored by John Du Prez
Golden Harvest films
Japan in non-Japanese culture
Hong Kong action comedy films
Hong Kong fantasy films
Hong Kong independent films
Hong Kong science fiction films
Hong Kong sequel films
Live-action films based on comics
Martial arts comedy films
Martial arts science fiction films
New Line Cinema films
Ninja films
Samurai films
Slapstick films
Teenage Mutant Ninja Turtles (1990 film series)
3
1990s American films